Ndondo Serge Philippe (born April 23, 1993) is a  footballer who plays  in Myanmar.

Profile 
He is a Cameroonian footballer who plays for Rakhine United as a center back and defensive midfielder. He learned to play football in several academies in Cameroon such as Kadji sport academy, Academy sport center and Foyer du Football et animation.

At only 17 years old he signed a contract with division 2 team in Cameroon named Wouri FC. In 2012 he signed with Don Bosco SC in Sri Lanka. With them he played 20 games and scored 1 goal and helped the team to play semi final of play off to Dialog Champions League.

Then he moved to Myanmar where he signed with GFA FC (Gospel for Asia) who played MNL1 (the highest league in the country) but the team were relegated at the end of the 2013-2014 season despite that it is lust by several big teams in Myanmar and Thailand it is re-sign by his former club and plays MNL 2 as team Captain. Anytime the club missed the promotion in MNL 1 but his great performance during league (scored hat-trick as center back  and two other goals as midfielder) and Ooredoo cup helped him to make a one-year deal with Rakhine United FC for the 2015-2016 season. And he just got the great deal to signed 1-year contract with Ayeyawady United FC for the 2017 season .

Honours 
 2005-2006
Minimal National Champions (Cameroon)
 2007-2008
Cup Winner Under 17 (Cameroon)
 2008-2009
Selected National Team Cameroon Under 17 (Cameroon)

References

External links
Myanmar - Rakhapura United FC
Myanmar National League - Rakhapura United FC
Myanmar Football Federation

1993 births
Living people
Cameroonian footballers
Cameroonian expatriate footballers
Expatriate footballers in Myanmar
Ayeyawady United F.C. players
Rakhine United F.C. players
Don Bosco FC players
Association football midfielders